NGC 5765, also designated as MCG+01-38-004 and MCG+01-38-005, is a pair of interacting megamasers in the constellation Virgo, roughly  away from Earth. NGC 5765B is active, and energy is released from the core, some of which is absorbed by a nearby cloud of water. The cloud then re-emits this energy as microwaves. These emissions were used to help redefine the Hubble constant.

References

External links 
 

Virgo (constellation)
Interacting galaxies
5765
09554